Paul Milton Jackson Jr. (born December 30, 1959) is an American fusion/urban jazz composer, arranger, producer and guitarist. He was born and raised in Los Angeles. Jackson knew by the age of fifteen that he wanted to become a professional musician. He attended the University of Southern California, majoring in music.

In addition to being a recording artist in his own right, Jackson is also a highly accomplished L.A. session player, with a career spanning multiple decades.  He has supported artists ranging from Michael Jackson (no relation) (on the albums Thriller, Bad, Dangerous, HIStory and Blood on the Dance Floor: HIStory in the Mix) to the Temptations, Whitney Houston, Alexander O'Neal, Five Star (on the album Silk and Steel), Howard Hewett, Thomas Anders, Patti LaBelle and Luis Miguel, to rockers such as Chicago and Elton John, to jazz-oriented players such as George Duke, George Benson, Dave Koz, Al Jarreau, David Benoit, Marcus Miller and Kirk Whalum, and to Christian artists such as Leon Patillo and Don Moen.

In 2013 it was revealed he contributed to several tracks on the album, Random Access Memories by Daft Punk and UK based singer songwriter Birdy's second album Fire Within. He also played guitar on Lisa Stansfield's 2014 album, Seven.

Jackson can be seen playing guitar in a wide variety of styles on The Tonight Show With Jay Leno and American Idol.

Discography

As leader
 I Came to Play (1988, Atlantic)
 Out of the Shadows (1990, Atlantic)
 A River in the Desert (1993, Atlantic)
 Never Alone: Duets (1996, Blue Note)
 The Power of the String (2001, Blue Note)
 Still Small Voice (2003, Blue Note)
 Lay It Back (2008, Branch)
 Stories from Stompin' Willie (2016, Branch)

With 'Jazz Funk Soul' (Jeff Lorber/Everette Harp/Paul Jackson Jr.)
 Life and Times (2019, Shanachie)
 Forecast (2022, Shanachie)

Session musician credits
With Oleta Adams
 All the Love (Pioneer Entertainment, 2001)

With Anastacia
 Not That Kind (Epic, 2000)

With Jon Anderson
 In the City of Angels (Columbia, 1988)

With Paul Anka
 Somebody Loves You (Polydor, 1989)

With Patti Austin
 Patti Austin (Qwest/WB, 1984)
 Gettin' Away with Murder (Qwest/WB, 1985)
 On the Way to Love (Warner Bros., 2001)
 Sound Advice (Shanachie, 2011)

With Joan Baez
 Recently (Gold Castle, 1987)

With Philip Bailey
 The Wonders of His Love (Myrrh, 1985)
 Triumph (Word, 1986)

With Anita Baker
 The Songstress (Elektra, 1983)
 Rapture (Elektra, 1986)
 Giving You the Best That I Got (Elektra, 1988)
 Rhythm of Love (Elektra, 1994)
 My Everything (Blue Note, 2004)

With George Benson
 20/20 (Warner Bros., 1985)
 While the City Sleeps... (Warner Bros., 1986)
 Twice the Love (Warner Bros., 1988)
 Standing Together (GRP, 1998)
 Songs and Stories (Concord, 2009)
 Guitar Man (Concord, 2011)

With Stephen Bishop
 Sleeping with Girls (Big Pink, 1985)

With Michael Bolton
 All That Matters (Columbia, 1997)

With Laura Branigan
 Self Control (Atlantic, 1984)

With Peabo Bryson
 Straight from the Heart (Elektra, 1984)
 All My Love (Capitol, 1989)
 Can You Stop the Rain (Columbia, 1991)
 Unconditional Love (Private Music, 1999)
 Missing You (Peak/Concord, 2007)

With Solomon Burke
 The Definition Of Soul (Point Blank/Virgin, 1997)

With Donald Byrd
 Thank You...For F.U.M.L. (Funking Up My Life) (Elektra, 1978)

With Irene Cara
 Carasmatic (Elektra, 1987)

With Belinda Carlisle
 Live Your Life Be Free (Virgin, 1991)

With Chicago
 Chicago 17 (Full Moon/Warner Bros., 1984)

With Leonard Cohen
 The Future (Columbia, 1992)

With Natalie Cole
 I'm Ready (Epic, 1983)
 Dangerous (Atco, 1985)
 Everlasting (Elektra, 1987)
 Good to Be Back (Elektra, 1989)
 Holly & Ivy (Elektra, 1994)
 Stardust (Elektra, 1996)
 Leavin' (Verve, 2006)

With Randy Crawford
 Windsong (Warner Bros., 1982)
 Abstract Emotions (Warner Bros., 1986)
 Through the Eyes of Love (Warner Bros., 1992)
 Don't Say It's Over (Warner Bros., 1993)

With Céline Dion
 Unison (Columbia, 1990)
 A New Day Has Come (Columbia, 2002)

With George Duke
  Thief in the Night (Elektra Records, 1985)

With Sheena Easton
 Best Kept Secret (EMI, 1983)
 No Strings (MCA, 1993)

With José Feliciano
 José Feliciano (Motown, 1981)
 Ya Soy Tuyo (RCA, 1985)
 Te Amaré (RCA, 1986)

With Five Star
 Silk & Steel (RCA, 1986)

With Roberta Flack
 Oasis (Atlantic, 1988)

With Aretha Franklin
 Aretha (Arista, 1980)
 What You See Is What You Sweat (Arista, 1991)
 This Christmas, Aretha (DMI, 2008)

With Michael Franks
 Dragonfly Summer (Warner Bros., 1993)

With Glenn Frey
 Soul Searchin' (MCA, 1988)

With Gloria Gaynor
 Gloria Gaynor (Atlantic, 1982)

With Amy Grant
 Unguarded (A&M, 1985)

With Thelma Houston
 Thelma Houston (MCA, 1983)

With Whitney Houston
  I'm Your Baby Tonight (Arista Records, 1990)

With The Jackson 5
 Destiny (Epic, 1978)
 Triumph (Epic, 1980)

With Michael Jackson
 Thriller (Epic, 1982)
 Bad (Epic, 1987)
 Dangerous (Epic, 1991)

With Al Jarreau
 High Crime (Warner Bros., 1984)
 Heart's Horizon (Reprise, 1988)
 Tomorrow Today (GRP, 2000)
 All I Got (GRP, 2002)
 My Old Friend: Celebrating George Duke (Concord, 2014)

With Jewel
 Spirit (Atlantic, 1998)

With Elton John
 Duets (Rocket, 1993)

With Ron Kenoly
 Sing Out with One Voice (Integrity, Hosanna! Music, 1995)
 Welcome Home (Integrity, Hosanna! Music, 1996)
 Majesty (Integrity, Hosanna! Music, 1998)
 We Offer Praises (Integrity, Hosanna! Music, 1999)

With Chaka Khan
 Chaka Khan (Warner Bros., 1982)

With B.B. King
 Take It Home (MCA, 1979)

With Carole King
 Love Makes the World (Rockingale, 2001)

With Patti LaBelle
 Winner in You (MCA, 1986)

With Kenny Loggins
 Vox Humana (Columbia, 1985)
 Leap of Faith (Columbia, 1991)

With Cheryl Lynn
 In Love (Columbia, 1979)
 Start Over (Manhattan/EMI, 1987)
 Whatever It Takes (Virgin, 1989)

With Madonna
 True Blue (Warner Bros., 1986)

With Melissa Manchester
 Mathematics (MCA, 1985)

With Barry Manilow
 If I Should Love Again (Arista, 1981)
 Here Comes the Night (Arista, 1982)
 Manilow (RCA, 1985)
 Swing Street (Arista, 1987)

With Teena Marie
 Robbery (Epic, 1983)

With Amanda Marshall
 Tuesday's Child (Epic, 1999)

With Michael McDonald
 Blink of an Eye (Reprise, 1993)

With Glenn Medeiros
 Not Me (Mercury, 1988)
 Glenn Medeiros (Mercury, 1990)

With Idina Menzel
 Holiday Wishes (Warner Bros., 2014)

With Bette Midler
 Bette (Warner Bros., 2000)

With Luis Miguel
 Soy Como Quiero Ser (WEA Latina, 1987)
 Busca una Mujer (WEA Latina, 1988)
 20 Años (WEA Latina, 1990)
 Aries (WEA Latina, 1993)
 Segundo Romance (WEA Latina, 1994)
 Amarte Es Un Placer (WEA Latina, 1999)
 Mis Romances (WEA Latina, 2001)
 33 (WEA Latina, 2003)
 Navidades (WEA Latina, 2006)

With Stephanie Mills
 I've Got the Cure (Casablanca, 1984)
 Stephanie Mills (MCA, 1985)

With Don Moen
 Let Your Glory Fall (Integrity, Hosanna! Music, 1997)
 God Is Good – Worship with Don Moen (Integrity, Hosanna! Music, 1998)

With Aaron Neville
 The Grand Tour (A&M, 1993)
 Aaron Neville's Soulful Christmas (A&M, 1993)

With Jeffrey Osborne
 Jeffrey Osborne (A&M, 1982)
 Stay with Me Tonight (A&M, 1983)
 Don't Stop (A&M, 1984)
 Emotional (A&M, 1985)
 One Love: One Dream (A&M, 1988)
 Something Warm for Christmas (Koch, 1997)
 A Time for Love (Saguaro, 2013)

With Ray Parker Jr.
 Sex and the Single Man (Arista, 1985)
 After Dark (Geffen, 1987)

With Billy Preston
 Late at Night (Motown, 1979)
 The Way I Am (Motown, 1981)

With Billy Preston and Syreeta Wright
 Billy Preston & Syreeta (Motown, 1981)

With Corinne Bailey Rae
 The Heart Speaks in Whispers (Virgin, 2016)

With Lionel Richie
 Lionel Richie (Motown, 1982)

With Minnie Riperton
 Love Lives Forever (Capitol, 1980)

With Kenny Rogers
 Christmas (Liberty, 1981)
 Love Will Turn You Around (Liberty, 1982)
 We've Got Tonight (Liberty, 1983)
 What About Me? (RCA, 1984)
 The Heart of the Matter (RCA, 1985)

With Kenny Rogers and Dolly Parton
 Once Upon a Christmas (Elektra, 1984)

With Jennifer Rush
 Heart Over Mind (Epic, 1987)

With Brenda Russell
 Get Here (A&M, 1988)

With Carole Bayer Sager
 Sometimes Late at Night (Boardwalk, 1981)

With David Sanborn
 Close Up (Reprise, 1988)

With Boz Scaggs
 Other Roads (Columbia, 1988)

With Lalo Schifrin
 No One Home (Tabu, 1979)

With Lisa Stansfield
 Seven (Edel, 2014)

 With Steely Dan 
 Two Against Nature (Giant/WB, 2000)

With Rod Stewart
 Vagabond Heart (Warner Bros., 1991)
 Soulbook (J Records, 2009)

With Maureen Steele
 Nature of the Beast (Motown, 1985)With Barbra Streisand Emotion (Columbia, 1984)
 Till I Loved You (Columbia, 1988)With Donna Summer Bad Girls (Casablanca, 1979)
 Cats Without Claws (Geffen, 1984)
 All Systems Go (Geffen, 1987)With Frankie Valli Heaven Above Me (MCA, 1980)With Luther Vandross Give Me the Reason (Epic, 1986)
 Any Love (Epic, 1988)
 Power of Love (Epic, 1991)
 Never Let Me Go (Epic, 1993)
 Your Secret Love (Epic, 1996)
 I Know (Virgin, 1998)
 Luther Vandross (J Records, 2001)
 Dance with My Father (J Records, 2003)With Dionne Warwick How Many Times Can We Say Goodbye (Arista, 1983)
 Finder of Lost Loves (Arista, 1985)
 Friends Can Be Lovers (Arista, 1993)With Deniece Williams I'm So Proud (Columbia, 1983)
 Let's Hear It for the Boy (Columbia, 1984)
 Hot on the Trail (Columbia, 1986)
 So Glad I Know (Sparrow, 1986)
 As Good as It Gets (Columbia, 1988)
 Special Love (MCA, 1989)With Bill Withers Watching You Watching Me (Columbia, 1985)With Syreeta Wright Syreeta (Tamla, 1980)
 Set My Love in Motion (Tamla, 1981)
 The Spell (Tamla, 1983)With Paul Young' The Crossing'' (Columbia, 1993)

References

External links 
official site

African-American jazz musicians
American jazz guitarists
Smooth jazz guitarists
American session musicians
American rock guitarists
Lead guitarists
American funk guitarists
American soul guitarists
American rhythm and blues guitarists
Jazz musicians from California
1959 births
Living people
USC Thornton School of Music alumni
The Tonight Show Band members
Guitarists from Los Angeles
20th-century American guitarists
African-American guitarists
20th-century African-American musicians
21st-century African-American people